Solenomorpha is an extinct genus of bivalve molluscs that lived from the Late Ordovician to the Late Triassic in Australia, Europe, and North America.

References

 Solenomorpha in the Paleobiology Database
 Fossils (Smithsonian Handbooks) by David Ward (Page 112)

Prehistoric bivalve genera
Ordovician bivalves
Silurian bivalves
Devonian bivalves
Carboniferous bivalves
Permian bivalves
Triassic bivalves
Prehistoric invertebrates of Oceania
Prehistoric animals of Europe
Prehistoric bivalves of North America
Late Ordovician first appearances
Late Triassic extinctions
Taxa named by Theodore Dru Alison Cockerell